Chahra (Punjabi, Urdu: چاھڑہ, also spelled Chara), is a village in Gujrat District in the Punjab Province of Pakistan. Chahra is about 15 km from Gujrat city.

According to 2017 Census of Pakistan, its population consists of 626 people and 105 households. Majority of the people of Chahra belong to the Gujjar caste.

Nearby villages include Malikpur, Kot Bela, Miana Kot and the town of Deona. Prominent families from Chahra include late Ch Ghulam Haider and late Haji Mian Abdul Rehman.

There is a Govt. Girls Primary School in the village.

References 

Villages in Gujrat District
Villages in Punjab, Pakistan